The Lower Himalayan Range ( parbat shrinkhalā) – also called the Middle Himalayas or Lesser Himalayas or Himachal – is a major east–west mountain range with elevations 3,700 to 4,500 m (12,000 to 14,500 feet) in the northernmost regions of the Indian subcontinent along the crest, paralleling the much higher High Himalayas range from the Indus River in Pakistan across northern India, Nepal and Bhutan but then the two ranges become increasingly difficult to differentiate east of Bhutan as the ranges approach the Brahmaputra River. The Himachal range also parallels the lower Shiwalik or Churia Range (Outer Himalaya) to the south. The Pir Panjal is the largest range of the Lesser Himalayas.

Background
Southern slopes of the Himachal Range are steep and nearly uninhabited due to a major fault system called the 'Main Boundary Thrust". The crest and northern slopes slope gently enough to support upland pastures and terraced fields. Nepal's densely populated Middle Hills begin along the crest, extending north through lower valleys and other "hills" until population thins out above 2,000 m and cereal-based agriculture increasingly gives way to seasonal herding and cold-tolerant crops such as potatoes.

Most ethnic groups found along the Himachal Range and northward into the Middle Hills have Tibeto-Burman affinities including Nepalese origins of Newar, Magar, Gurung, Tamang, Rai and Limbu, however the most populous ethnic group is Indo-European Hindus called Paharis, mainly of the upper Brahman, and Kshatriya, or Chhetri castes. Lower terrain south of the escarpment was historically malarial and inhabited by apparently aboriginal peoples with evolved immunity, notably the Tharu and Maithili people.

The Himachal Range is an important hydrographic barrier crossed by relatively few rivers. Drainage systems have evolved candelabra configurations with numerous tributaries flowing south from the Himalaya through the Middle Hills, gathering immediately north of the Himachal Range and cutting through in major gorges as the Karnali in the west, the Gandaki or Narayani in central Nepal, and the Kosi in the east.

With temperatures persisting around forty degrees Celsius in the plains of India from April until the onset of the summer monsoon in June, but ten to fifteen degrees cooler atop the Himachal Range, Hill Stations were developed as alternate capitals and resorts for the hot season by India's Mughal and British rulers. There are no hill stations in Nepal or Bhutan since the capital cities are high enough to avoid extreme heat.

References

L
Mountain ranges of Bhutan
Mountain ranges of India
Mountain ranges of Nepal
Mountain ranges of Pakistan